"Different Kind of Love" is the debut single by Third Degree who finished fourth on season five of The X Factor Australia. It was released digitally by Sony Music Australia on 1 November 2013.

Background and release
"Different Kind of Love" was written by U.K singer/songwriter Leon Else with Ben Berger and Ryan McMahon of Los Angeles production duo Captain Cuts. It would have been Third Degree's winner's single for the fifth season of The X Factor, if they had won the show. However, they finished in fourth place. On 1 November 2013, it was announced that Third Degree had signed a recording contract with Sony Music Australia along with second and third place Taylor Henderson and Jai Waetford. "Different Kind of Love" was released digitally as their debut single later that day. A CD single was released on 8 November.

Track listing
CD / digital download
 "Different Kind of Love" – 3:40

Charts

Release history

References

2013 songs
2013 debut singles
Sony Music Australia singles
Songs written by Ben Berger
Songs written by Ryan McMahon (record producer)
Song recordings produced by Captain Cuts